Raso may refer to:

People
 Angelo Raso (born 1981), Italian football player
 Chiara Raso (born 1981), Italian ski mountaineer
 Frank Raso
 Hayley Raso (born 1994), Australian football player
 Mark Raso, Canadian filmmaker
 Marko Rašo (born 1989), Croatian football player
 Michael Raso (born 1980), Italian cricket player
 Momčilo Rašo (born 1997), Montenegrin football player
 Rašo Babić (born 1977), Serbian football player
 Rašo Vučinić (born 1982), Serbian bobsledder and politician

Places
 Cabo Raso, Portugal
 Ilhéu Raso, Cape Verde
 Raso lark, Cape Verde

Other
 Rasa (literary form), a literary form of Gujarati literature also spelled Raso